La Montañuela is a corregimiento in Atalaya District, Veraguas Province, Panama with a population of 786 as of 2010. Its population as of 1990 was 745; its population as of 2000 was 736.

References

Corregimientos of Veraguas Province